The Dead Indian Canyon Bridge, near Desert View in Coconino County, Arizona, is a Warren truss bridge built in 1933 as part of developing public highway approach from the east to the south rim of the Grand Canyon. It was listed on the National Register of Historic Places in 1988.

It was designed by the U.S. Bureau of Public Roads and was built by contractors Vinson & Pringle of Phoenix.

According to HAER documentation, "Dead Indian Canyon Bridge is significant for its association with the Cameron Approach Road, constructed in 1931–35 as the first modern automotive road linking the south rim of Grand Canyon National Park to the eastern Navajo Reservation and regional highways in northeastern Arizona. The bridge is also illustrative of roads and road structures built within special federal legislative authority to connect western national parks through a park-to-park highway system."

It was also deemed significant as the last-built and the longest of Arizona's deck truss bridges.

See also
List of bridges documented by the Historic American Engineering Record in Arizona
List of bridges on the National Register of Historic Places in Arizona

References

External links

Bridges completed in 1933
Bridges on the National Register of Historic Places in Arizona
Historic American Engineering Record in Arizona
National Register of Historic Places in Coconino County, Arizona
Warren truss bridges